Epipaschia superatalis, the dimorphic macalla moth, is a moth in the family Pyralidae. It is found in eastern North America.

The wingspan is 17–25 mm. The forewings are greenish up to the postmedial line and reddish brown beyond. Adults are on wing from late May to August.

References

Moths described in 1860
Epipaschiinae